Blood Ranch is 2006 American horror film directed by Corbin Timbrook and starring Jim Fitzpatrick, Dayton Knoll, Scott L. Schwartz, and Season Hamilton.

Premise
Four college students and an Iraq War veteran encounter a young woman lost in the desert with a black van chasing her.  They survive the chase yet their car breaks down and are forced to seek shelter at a mysterious ranch.

References

External links

American horror films
2006 films
Films set on farms
2000s English-language films
2000s American films